Andreas Mies (born 21 August 1990) is a German professional tennis player who specialises in doubles.

He is a two-time Grand Slam champion, having won the French Open doubles title in both 2019 and 2020 alongside compatriot Kevin Krawietz. The pair also reached the semifinals at the 2019 US Open and qualified for the 2019 and 2020 ATP Finals. Mies reached his career-high doubles ranking of world No. 8 on 4 November 2019, and has won five doubles titles on the ATP Tour. He played college tennis for the Auburn Tigers, and has represented Germany in the Davis Cup since 2019.

Professional career

2017
Mies won his first ATP Challenger Tour doubles title at the Garden Open in Rome, partnering Oscar Otte.

2018: New partnership with Krawietz
Mies made his ATP World Tour and Grand Slam debut at the Wimbledon Championships in doubles with partner Kevin Krawietz as a qualifier, where they lost in the third round to the later champions Mike Bryan and Jack Sock despite having two match points.

2019: Historic French Open doubles title
Mies won his first doubles title on the ATP Tour at the New York Open, again with Krawietz.

He and Krawietz won sensationally the French Open doubles title as unseeded players, defeating the French duo Jérémy Chardy and Fabrice Martin in the final. This victory made them the first all-German team in the Open Era to win a Grand Slam title, and the first since Gottfried von Cramm  and Henner Henkel in 1937.

At the US Open, he and Krawietz reached the semifinals. They won their third title at the European Open in Antwerp.

2020: Second French Open doubles title
Mies and Krawietz successfully defended their French Open title, defeating Mate Pavić and Bruno Soares in the final in straight sets. Having won the title twice, they had not lost a match at the French Open together.

2021: Hiatus due to injury
Mies was sidelined for the a considerable part of the 2021 season as a result of a knee injury.

2022: Reunion with Krawietz, one more ATP 500 title and second home final
At the French Open, Mies finally lost his first doubles match at tournament when him and Krawietz suffered an upset loss in the first round.

2023: New partnership with Peers
Mies and John Peers reached the quarterfinals of the Australian Open.

Doubles performance timeline 

Current through the 2023 Rotterdam Open.

Grand Slam finals

Doubles: 2 (2 titles)

ATP career finals

Doubles: 7 (6 titles, 1 runner-up)

ATP Challenger and ITF Futures finals

Doubles: 39 (28–11)

National participation

Davis Cup (4–0)

ATP Cup  (1–2)

References

External links
 
 
 
 Andreas Mies on Facebook
 Andreas Mies on Instagram
 Official website of Andreas Mies 

1990 births
Living people
German male tennis players
Tennis players from Cologne
French Open champions
Grand Slam (tennis) champions in men's doubles
Auburn Tigers men's tennis players
21st-century German people